Frank McIlwraith (born 1892) was a Scottish professional footballer who played as a left back.

Career
McIlwraith joined Bradford City from Ardeer Thistle in January 1912. He made 5 league appearances for the club. He left the club in 1913 after being released.

Sources

References

1892 births
Date of death missing
Scottish footballers
Ardeer Thistle F.C. players
Bradford City A.F.C. players
English Football League players
Association football fullbacks